Heteropterna cressoni is a species of predatory fungus gnat in the family Keroplatidae.

References

Further reading

External links

 

Keroplatidae
Articles created by Qbugbot
Insects described in 1941